Crest was a wooden steamboat that operated on Puget Sound in the early 1900s.  Following a sale of the vessel in May, 1912, this boat was known as Bay Island.

Career
In 1899, the Hunt Brothers, a family steamboat business, had Crest built at Tacoma for service on the Tacoma-Gig Harbor route  
Crest was built according to a tear drop shaped design, which was originated by the Hunt brothers.  While this did not increase the speed of the boat, it allowed the vessel to carry more passengers and cargo at the same speed.

In 1902 the Hunt Brothers divided their interest in the firm's boats, with Emmett Hunt taking ownership of Crest.

In 1912, Emmett Hunt, for $11,500, sold Crest to the Hale Passage and Wollochet Bay Navigation Company, which was a farmer's cooperative seeking a way to lower transport costs on produce.  The cooperative renamed the vessel Bay Island.  Bay Island made as many as 10 stops along the cooperative's route in Hale Passage and Wollochet Bay, and ran in the evening so the produce cargo would be fresh in the morning at the market.

Bay Island was abandoned in 1929.

See also 
Puget Sound Mosquito Fleet

Notes

References
 Findlay, Jean Cammon and Paterson, Robin, Mosquito Fleet of Southern Puget Sound, (2008) Arcadia Publishing 
 Newell, Gordon R., ed., H.W. McCurdy Marine History of the Pacific Northwest, Superior Publishing, Seattle, WA 1966
 Newell, Gordon, Ships of the Inland Sea, Binford and Mort, Portland, OR (2nd Ed. 1960)
 Newell, Gordon, and Williamson, Joe, Pacific Steamboats, Bonanza Books, New York, NY (1963)

External links
 Gig Harbor Museum, “Steamboats and the Hunt Brothers” (accessed 04-14-2011)

1900 ships
Steamboats of Washington (state)
Propeller-driven steamboats of Washington (state)